F. nana  may refer to:
 Festuca nana, a plant species in the genus Festuca
 Fuchsia nana, a plant species in the genus Fuchsia

See also
 Nana (disambiguation)